Palaquium cochleariifolium is a tree in the family Sapotaceae. The specific epithet cochleariifolium means "spoon-shaped leaves".

Description
The bark is dark brown. The inflorescences bear up to 14 flowers.

Distribution and habitat
Palaquium cochleariifolium is endemic to Borneo. Its habitat is in swamps and kerangas forests.

References

cochleariifolium
Endemic flora of Borneo
Trees of Borneo
Plants described in 1960